Lady Alexandra Margaret Elizabeth Douglas-Home (née Spencer, 4 July 1906 – 26 May 1996) was an English musician, writer, and arts promoter. She founded the Burnham Market Festival and served as its director for almost two decades.

Early years
Born into the aristocratic Spencer family in London in 1906, she was the sixth and youngest child of Charles Spencer, 6th Earl Spencer, and Hon. Margaret Baring (1868–1906), daughter of the first Lord Revelstoke, a banker. Her godmother was Queen Alexandra. Her youth was spent at Althorp and at Spencer House.

Lady Margaret was mainly educated at home under a governess, but spent some time at Northampton Secondary School for Girls, attending events such as concerts at the Albert Hall. She shared the musical interests of her mother and grandmother, who were both violinists, and became herself an accomplished pianist. After her father's death in 1922, Lady Margaret went to Paris to study French and music. She then accompanied Princess Alice, Countess of Athlone to South Africa as a lady-in-waiting, before resuming her music studies in Vienna. She also studied at the Royal College of Music in London, where she later became a trustee.

Career
Lady Margaret worked in the publications department of the National Gallery in 1941 and as a lady-in-waiting to Princess Alexandra in the 1950s.

In the post-war years, she ran the Home and Van Thal publishing firm, together with Herbert van Thal and Gwylim Fielden Hughes, until was taken over by Arthur Barker about 1952.

Lady Margaret also bought and ran an antiques business in Burnham Market, Norfolk. This led her in 1974 to found Burnham Market Festival, which began as a series of concerts, poetry readings and drama productions. She continued as its director until 1992.

Her autobiography, A Spencer Childhood, appeared in 1994.

Personal life
In 1931, Lady Margaret married Hon. Henry Montagu Douglas-Home (1907–1980), second son of the Charles Douglas-Home, 13th Earl of Home and a brother of Alec Douglas-Home, who served as Prime Minister of the United Kingdom in 1963–1964. The marriage was dissolved in 1947. They had two sons, Robin (died 1968) and Charles (died 1985). Their daughter Fiona married first Gregory Martin and secondly the merchant banker Sir Ian James Fraser (1923–2003), former chairman of Lazard. Lady Margaret was a great-aunt of Diana, Princess of Wales, and a close friend of Queen Elizabeth The Queen Mother. She died at Wells-next-the-Sea, Norfolk, in 1996.

Ancestry

References

1906 births
1996 deaths
Publishers (people) from London
Writers from London
English women pianists
Festival directors
Daughters of British earls
Margaret
Alumni of the Royal College of Music
20th-century British women writers
20th-century British non-fiction writers
20th-century British pianists
20th-century English musicians
People from Burnham Market
20th-century English women musicians
Festival founders
Women founders
20th-century English businesspeople
20th-century women pianists